Fabien Lavoyer (born July 29, 1985 in Dijon, France) is a French midfielder currently playing for Championnat de France amateur side Luçon.

References
General

Fabien Lavoyer profile at foot-national.com

External links
Profile at chamoisniortais.fr

1985 births
Living people
French footballers
Association football midfielders
Chamois Niortais F.C. players
US Créteil-Lusitanos players
FC Sochaux-Montbéliard players
Luçon FC players
SO Romorantin players
Sportspeople from Dijon
Footballers from Bourgogne-Franche-Comté